Sonyor Deng Festival is an annual festival celebrated by the chiefs and people of Sonyor in the Bole District in the Savannah Region, formally Northern region of Ghana. It is usually celebrated in the month of May.

Celebrations 
During the festival, live bush animals are presented to the shrine.

Significance 
It is celebrated by the Gonja worshippers of the Sonyor 'Kupo' shrine to pay homage to the shrine.

References 

Festivals in Ghana
Savannah Region (Ghana)